Sara Barrié was a Chilean born Argentine film actress who appeared in the cinema of Argentina in the 1940s. She appeared in films such as Un Atardecer de amor in 1943 working with actors such as Floren Delbene and Ana Arneodo

Partial filmography
 Si yo fuera rica (1941)
 Peluquería de señoras (1941)
 P'al otro lado (1942)
 The House of the Millions (1942)
 An Evening of Love (1943)
 A Woman of No Importance (1945)
 27 millones (1947)

External links
 

Chilean emigrants to Argentina
Argentine film actresses
Year of birth missing
Year of death missing